Apfelschorle (Apple Spritzer), also Apfelsaftschorle (Apple juice spritzer) or Apfelsaft gespritzt (Splashed apple juice) in German, is a popular soft drink in Switzerland, Germany, and Austria. It consists of carbonated mineral water and apple juice. The broader category Fruchtschorle consists of any fruit juice mixed with carbonated water, but Apfelschorle is by far the most common. Spritzer (that is, wine mixed with carbonated water) is called Weinschorle.

Nutrition
Apfelschorle contains fewer calories and is less sweet than pure apple juice. It is also nearly isotonic. This makes it popular in summer and among athletes.

Content
Commercially available Apfelschorle generally contains between 50% and 60% juice. Often, lemon juice concentrate is added.

Production
Brands of Apfelschorle in Germany include Spreequell, Gerolsteiner (which also sells mineral water), Rhodius, Bizzl, and many other local brands. The most famous brand in Switzerland is Ramseier. However, domestically and in most bars and restaurants Apfelschorle is usually mixed ad hoc from apple juice and carbonated water.

Folklore

According to Adelholzener, they produce 'healing water', mineral water and soft drinks. The 'healing' properties apparently originated 1700 years ago, when a Roman missionary, Primus, discovered the water source. According to the legend, Primus - who was later canonized - used the curative effects of the water and the power of the Christian faith to heal the sick.

See also
Schorle
Appletiser

References

German cuisine
Non-alcoholic mixed drinks
Apple sodas

de:Schorle#Apfelschorle